Zafra marisrubris is a species of sea snail in the family Columbellidae, the dove snails.

References

marisrubris
Gastropods described in 1998